The Montrose Botanic Gardens are located at 1800 Pavilion Drive, Montrose, Colorado, south of the Montrose Pavilion.

While in the gardens,  you can view the San Juan Mountains to the south.

Open dawn to dusk.  Free entry, but donations are always appreciated.

See also
 List of botanical gardens in the United States

External links
 Montrose Botanic Gardens, official site

Botanical gardens in Colorado
Montrose, Colorado
Protected areas of Montrose County, Colorado